Álamo Temapache (or simply Temapache) is a municipality located in the montane central zone in the Mexican state of Veracruz, about 90 km from state capital Xalapa. It has a surface of 65.80 km2. The municipal seat is at Álamo.

Geographic limits

The municipality of Temapache is delimited to the north by Tepetzintla, Cerro Azul and Tamiahua to the east by Tuxpam, to the south by Tihuatlán, Castillo de Teayo and the state of Puebla, and to the south-west by Ixhuatlán de Madero. It is drained by several rivers including the Hondo and the Buenavista.

Agriculture

It produces principally maize, beans, orange fruit, watermelon and pumpkins seed.

Celebrations

In Temapache, in September takes place the celebration in honor to Virgen del Carmen, Patron of the town, and in December takes place the celebration in honor to Virgen de Guadalupe.

Weather

The weather in Temapache is very cold and wet all year with rains in summer and autumn.

References

External links

  Municipal Official webpage
  Municipal Official Information

Municipalities of Veracruz